Antoine Koné (10 January 1963 – 8 May 2019) was an Ivorian Roman Catholic bishop.

Koné was born in the Republic of the Ivory Coast and was ordained to the priesthood on 28 December 1991. He taught French literature, Latin, and Theology at Saint John's Seminary (Katiola) in Ivory Coast during the early 1990s. He served as bishop  of the Roman Catholic Diocese of Odienné, Ivory Coast from 2009 until his death in 2019.

References

1963 births
2019 deaths
21st-century Roman Catholic bishops in Ivory Coast
Roman Catholic bishops of Odienné